Gateway Group is a multinational Information Technology services company headquartered in Ahmedabad, India.

History 

The company was established in the year 1997 as an IT training and web development firm and incorporated in the year 2000. Gradually the company ventured into enterprise solutions for various industries like automotive, healthcare, publishing and media, entertainment and gaming, BFSI, manufacturing, and retail.

Timeline 
1997: Company inception in Ahmedabad.
1998: Set up an IT training center.
2001: Company incorporated as Gateway Technolabs Pvt. Ltd.
2011: Established an Software export unit at Mindspace IT Special economic zone, Gandhinagar, Gujarat.
2012: Became one of the Microsoft's 50 'Most Competent' Partners.
2014: Entered in to the Middle East market by strategic tie up with Bahrain-based Al Nadeem Information Technology.
2015: Won the diamond award for best mobile development company at 8th GESIA Awards.
2017: Started business operations from its new office in Munich, Germany.

Locations
The company has operations in the following locations:

Asia:
 India

Europe:

 Belgium
 Denmark
 Finland
 France
 Germany
 Island
 Netherlands
 Norway
 Sweden
 United Kingdom

The Middle East

 UAE 
 Oman

North America:

 Canada 
 United States

Africa:
 South Africa

References 

Companies based in Ahmedabad
Companies established in 1997
Information technology companies of India
1997 establishments in Gujarat